Norr, also called North, is a city district in Malmö Municipality, Sweden. It was established on 1 July 2013 after the merger of Centrum and Kirseberg. It has a population of 62,100.

References

City districts of Malmö